Dorota Jakuta (born 16 January 1958) is a Polish politician, current Chairperson of Bydgoszcz City Council and Councillor who represents the 4th district.

On 12 November 2006 she was elected to Bydgoszcz City Council.  She scored 1,970 votes in 4th district, as candidate from Civic Platform list. She took office on 27 November 2006.  She was elected to Council Chairperson Office. She is a member of Enterprise, Development and City Promotion Committee and Municipal Economy and Environmental Protection Committee.

See also 
 Bydgoszcz City Council

External links 
 (pl) List of Members of Bydgoszcz City Council V Term (2006–2010)
 Photo of Dorota Jakuta

Members of Bydgoszcz City Council
1958 births
Living people